George Purefoy-Jervoise (10 April 1770 – 1 December 1847) was an English landowner and politician.

He was the eldest son of Rev. George Hudleston Jervoise Purefoy Jervoise of Britford, Wiltshire. He was educated at Westminster School from 1781 to 1786 and Corpus Christi College, Oxford from 1787 to 1791. He inherited the Herriard estate in Hampshire from his uncle Tristram Jervoise of Britford.

He was a Member of Parliament (MP) for Salisbury, 17 February 1813 – 1818, and for Hampshire 1820–1826. He was appointed High Sheriff of Hampshire for 1830–1831.

A house called Manor House was built for him at Stratford Tony, Wiltshire in 1833.

He married twice: firstly Elizabeth, the daughter and heiress of Thomas Hall of Preston Candover, Hampshire, and secondly Anna Maria Selina, the daughter of Wadham Locke of Rowdeford, Wiltshire.

References

External links
 

1770 births
1847 deaths
People from Basingstoke and Deane
Alumni of Corpus Christi College, Oxford
High Sheriffs of Hampshire
People educated at Westminster School, London
Members of the Parliament of the United Kingdom for English constituencies
UK MPs 1812–1818
UK MPs 1820–1826
People from Wiltshire